Bolo Raam is a 2009 Indian Hindi-language thriller film directed by Rakesh Chaturvedi, released on 31 December 2009. This film is a remake of the Tamil film Raam, released in 2005.

Plot
Bolo Raam follows the story of Raam, an angry young man obsessed with his mother. Raam is accused of her murder, leading to an investigation during which Raam chooses to remain silent.

During this whole time the investigation continues and Inspector Indrajeet Singh learns that Raam had the tendency to right wrongs and is serious about this. His mother was influenced by others to send him to a hostel but at the last minute she changed her decision seeing that her son could hurt someone there. During this time it is also revealed that his mother had run away from her house and married Raam's father, who left her before his birth. Juhi, daughter of sub-inspector Sajid Khan, falls in love with Raam and one night when she sneaks into his house, she finds him asleep. She gives him a kiss and is about to leave immediately when her father finds her and beats her. Raam's mother tries to stop him but Khan accuses her of being characterless. He then tries to arrest Raam under a false charge but his Juhi promises that she will never meet Raam again ever. It is found that Raam's mother was a woman of character and Raam was only aggressive some times not unstable. This time a psychiatrist, Dr. Negi finds that Raam is unstable as he can not believe his mother is dead. In between this scenario Raam also tries to runaway from jail once and is found near his mother's body claiming that his mother is asleep.

The day when Raam is about to be taken to court, Inspector Khan's son, Sameer, comes to Raam and tells him to accept his crime, during his visit Raam gets the hold of his sleeve button. Raam finally realizes that his mother is dead and that Sameer is the killer. He runs away from prison to avenge his mother. He reaches Khan's house and starts beating Sameer but Khan and Singh also arrive and discover the truth. Sameer was under influence of a Maulana who ran a terrorist group. He gave Sameer a book about terrorism, asking him to be careful. Raam's mother sees this and threatens to tell his father, so he kills her. Sameer then grasps Inspector's pistol and shoots him along with his father. Raam beats him and kills him in the end.

Cast
 Rishi Bhutani as Ram
 Disha Pandey as Juhi
 Padmini Kolhapure as Raam's mother
 Om Puri as Indrajeet Singh
 Naseeruddin Shah as Dr. Negi
 Govind Namdev as Sajid Khan
 Rajpal Yadav as Ram's friend

Reception
Taran Adarsh called it a "compelling flick" but complained the final mystery's resolution was sloppy and didn't follow its lead-up.
Sonia Chopra gave it half a star out of five.

Soundtrack

References

External links
 
 Bolo Raam Bollywood Hungama
 Article about the film's producer

2009 films
2000s Hindi-language films
Hindi remakes of Tamil films
Indian mystery thriller films